Uchaly Mosque  on Tashbiek mountain is a mosque in Uchaly, Bashkortostan, Russia. It is located opposite to the Uchaly Public hospital.

See also
Islam in Russia
List of mosques in Russia
List of mosques in Europe

References

Mosques completed in 2009
Mosques in Bashkortostan